James Walter Wise (March 3, 1868 – September 8, 1925) was a U.S. Representative from Georgia.

Born near McDonough, Henry County, Georgia, Wise attended the common schools.
He studied law at Emory College in Oxford, Georgia.
He was admitted to the bar in 1892 and commenced practice in Fayetteville, Georgia, in January 1893.
He served as member of the State house of representatives in 1902–1908.
He was mayor of Fayetteville in 1904–1906.
He served as solicitor general of the Flint judicial circuit in 1908–1912.

Wise was elected as a Democrat to the 64th and to the four succeeding Congresses (March 4, 1915 – March 3, 1925).
Due to a prolonged illness, he was unable to qualify for or attend the 68th Congress.
He declined to be a candidate for renomination in 1924.
He died in Atlanta, Georgia, on September 8, 1925.
He was interred in McDonough Cemetery, McDonough, Georgia.

References

External links 
 

1868 births
1925 deaths
People from Henry County, Georgia
Georgia (U.S. state) lawyers
Emory University alumni
Democratic Party members of the United States House of Representatives from Georgia (U.S. state)
People from Fayetteville, Georgia
19th-century American lawyers